Ahmed Mabukhut Shabiby (born 14 September 1967) is a Tanzanian CCM politician and Member of Parliament for Gairo constituency since 2005.

References

1967 births
Living people
Chama Cha Mapinduzi MPs
Tanzanian MPs 2005–2010
Tanzanian MPs 2010–2015
Forest Hill Secondary School alumni
Mgugu Secondary School alumni